Brabham Automotive Ltd. is an Australian automaker launched by David Brabham and Australian investor group, Fusion Capital in May 2018. Brabham Automotive is based in Adelaide, South Australia, with representation also in the United Kingdom.

Its first product is the Brabham BT62, which was initially launched as a track-only vehicle. In November 2019, the company announced a Competition version of the BT62 to coincide with its racing debut in the Britcar season finale at Brands Hatch.

Brabham Automotive's manufacturing base is in Edinburgh Parks, north of Adelaide, South Australia.

In 2020, Axalta has been appointed the unique paint supplier of Brabham Automotive. This collaboration is structured to ensure that each vehicle meets the highest quality requirements requested by both parties.

In 2021, Brabham entered competition in the GT2 European Series with the BT63 GT2.

See also

 List of automobile manufacturers
 List of car brands

References

External links

 

Motor vehicle manufacturers of England
Car manufacturers of the United Kingdom
Sports car manufacturers
Companies based in Hampshire
Vehicle manufacturing companies established in 2018
2018 establishments in England
Car brands
Car manufacturers of Australia
British companies established in 2018